The alveolar lateral ejective fricative is a type of consonantal sound, reported in the Northwest Caucasian languages and in Modern South Arabian languages.

Features
Features of the alveolar lateral ejective fricative:

Occurrence
 occurs in the reconstructed Proto-Semitic language.

See also
 Index of phonetics articles

References

External links
 

Fricative consonants
Alveolar consonants
Lateral consonants
Ejectives
Oral consonants